Ethelton is a north-western suburb of Adelaide  from the CBD, on the Lefevre Peninsula, in the state of South Australia, Australia.  It is a residential suburb within the local government area of City of Port Adelaide Enfield, adjacent to the suburbs of Semaphore, Semaphore South, Glanville and New Port. It is bounded to the north by Hart Street, to the south by Bower Road and in the west by Swan Terrace and in the east by Causeway Road.

Facilities 
The suburb is not served by a public primary school. The nearest are Le Fevre Primary School in Birkenhead and Westport Primary School in Semaphore Park. The area was previously serviced by Ethelton Primary School, but the campus was closed when the school amalgamated with Semaphore Primary School (to form Westport Primary). The local high school is Le Fevre High School, in nearby Semaphore South. There is a private school in the suburb, Portside Christian School (Reception to Year 12).

The John Hart Reserve and Oval at the north-western corner is the main recreational facility in the suburb. There is little commercial activity in the area, as Port Adelaide is nearby.

New Port is a housing development and suburb created in 2007 on the Port River and is next to Ethelton.

Transport 

 the 333 bus services Bower Road and Hart Street, while suburb is also served by the 651, 657, 662, 665, and 672.

The suburb also is serviced by a train station on the Outer Harbor railway line, the Ethelton railway station, and the H1 Outer Harbor to City train substitute service.

Governance
Ethelton is located in the federal division of Hindmarsh, the state electoral district of Port Adelaide and the local government area of the City of Port Adelaide Enfield.

References

Suburbs of Adelaide
Lefevre Peninsula